Milton Banana (born Antônio de Souza) (23 April 1935 – 22 May 1999) was a Brazilian bossa nova and jazz drummer. A self-taught musician, he is best known for his collaboration with João Gilberto and Stan Getz and for his work with the trio he founded.

Discography

Bossa nova drummers
1935 births
1998 deaths
Brazilian drummers
20th-century drummers